Prokunino is a rural locality (a village) in Golovinskoye Rural Settlement, Sudogodsky District, Vladimir Oblast, Russia. The population was 4 as of 2010.

Geography 
It is located 4 km north-west from Golovino, 3 km east from Sudogda.

References 

Rural localities in Sudogodsky District